{{DISPLAYTITLE:C6H14N2O3}}
The molecular formula C6H14N2O3 (molar mass: 162.19 g/mol) may refer to:

 Bacillosamine
 Hydroxylysine (Hyl)

Molecular formulas